William Walton Gooddy  (1916–2004) was an English neurologist.

Biography
After education at Winchester College and a nine-month tour of Germany, William Gooddy studied medicine at University College London. There he met his wife-to-be, Edda, who was a medical student in the same graduating class. He qualified MRCS, LRCP in 1941. After qualifying, Gooddy and his wife became RAMC officers. He became house physician to the medical unit at University College Hospital and graduated MB BS (Lond.) in 1942. At University College Hospital, he was influenced by Francis Walshe. During WWII Gooddy was first a regimental medical officer and was then stationed until 1945 at St Hugh's Military Hospital for head injuries. During his army training he was among the first physicians to prescribe penicillin. In 1946 he graduated MD (Lond.). Later he was put in charge of the medical division of the British Military Hospital, Berlin.

In 1948 Gooddy was appointed physician to the neurological department of University College Hospital and assistant physician to the National Hospital for Neurology and Neurosurgery in Queen Square, London. He was elected FRCP in 1953. He wrote a foreword for Oliver Sacks's 1970 book Migraine. Gooddy delivered in 1976 the Bradshaw Lecture on Time and the nervous system: the neuron as an escapement.
 
Later in his career he became interested in the role of trace elements in the causation of neurological disease, delivering the 8th Gowers Memorial Lecture on chemical elements, neurology, and abiotrophy.

Upon his death in 2004 he was survived by his widow, a son, a daughter and three grandchildren.

Selected publications

Articles

with A. D. Dayan, M. J. G. Harrison, and Peter Rudge: 
with D. L. McAuley and D. A. Isenberg: 

with W. M. Edmondstone, D. K. Price, and T. H. Shepherd: 

M. Baraitser, A. M. Halliday, A. E. Harding, P. Rudge, and F. Scaravilli:

Books

References

1916 births
2004 deaths
20th-century English medical doctors
British neurologists
People educated at Winchester College
Alumni of the UCL Medical School
Physicians of University College Hospital
Royal Army Medical Corps officers
Fellows of the Royal College of Physicians